Ambush is a 1988 Filipino action film directed by Francis 'Jun' Posadas and written by Jerry O. Tirazona. It stars Ronnie Ricketts, Dick Israel, Sonny Parsons, E.R. Ejercito, Leo Lazaro, Bobby Zshornack, and Beverly Vergel. The film depicts an armed struggle between the New People's Army's Sparrow Unit and the Armed Forces of the Philippines. Produced by Regent Films, Ambush was released in theaters on July 13, 1988.

It was given a mildly positive review by critic Lav Diaz, who praised its non-propagandistic depiction of ideological conflicts between communist revolutionaries and law enforcers, while criticizing its technical flaws and the inclusion of an implausible character.

Plot summary

Cast
 Ronnie Ricketts as Ka Mario
 Dick Israel as Ka Diego
 Sonny Parsons
 E.R. Ejercito
 Leo Lazaro
 Bobby Zshornack
 Beverly Vergel
 Raoul Aragonn
 Odette Khan
 Johnny Wilson
 Joonee Gamboa
 Johnny Vicar
 Gladys Reyes
 Vic Varrion
 Rey Sagum
 Danny Riel
 Rene Matias
 Grego Gavino
 Robert Talby
 Dave Moreno
 Jess Bernardo

Production
Ambush was one of the first major roles of Bobby Zshornack and Leo Lazaro, part of a group called the "Escolta Boys" who mostly starred in action films. On April 11, Beverly Vergel did her own stunt of driving a pickup truck through a fruit stand.

Critical response
Lav Diaz, writing for the Manila Standard, gave a mildly positive review of the film. He praised the film's non-propagandistic and unbiased depiction of the ideological conflicts between communist revolutionaries such as the Sparrow Unit and enforcers of the law, but considered the filmmakers' inclusion of an inexperienced recruit within the demanding unit as unbelievable and the film's "biggest mistake", in addition to its other technical faults. He concluded, however, that if viewers watched the film solely for its action, it is worth the cost of admission.

Accolades

See also
Other film depictions of the Sparrow Unit starring Ronnie Ricketts:
 Sparrow Unit: The Termination Squad (1987)
 Target... Maganto (1988)
 Alex Boncayao Brigade (1989)

References

External links
 

1988 films
1988 action films
Filipino-language films
Philippine action films